Brooke Peris (born 16 January 1993) is an Australian field hockey player. She is a member of the Australia women's national field hockey team. Peris was awarded the title of "Northern Territory Sportsperson of the Year" in 2014. She is the first cousin of former national field hockey player and former Australian senator Nova Peris. She was selected to represent Australia at the 2016 Rio Olympics.

Peris qualified for the Tokyo 2020 Olympics. She was part of the Hockeyroos Olympics squad. The Hockeyroos lost 1-0 to India in the quarterfinals and therefore were not in medal contention.

References

External links
 
 
 

Living people
1993 births
Sportspeople from Darwin, Northern Territory
Australian female field hockey players
Sportswomen from the Northern Territory
Field hockey players at the 2014 Commonwealth Games
Indigenous Australian Olympians
Field hockey players at the 2016 Summer Olympics
Olympic field hockey players of Australia
Commonwealth Games medallists in field hockey
Commonwealth Games gold medallists for Australia
Female field hockey forwards
Field hockey players at the 2020 Summer Olympics
21st-century Australian women
Medallists at the 2014 Commonwealth Games